It's a Game may refer to:

Music
It's a Game (Bay City Rollers album), 1977
It's a Game (Les McKeown album), 1988
 It's a Game (Edith Frost album), 2005

Songs
"It's a Game", song from It's a Game (Bay City Rollers album), 1977, originally by String Driven Thing (1973)
"It's a Game", song from It's a Game (Les McKeown album), 1988